Metitepine (developmental code names Ro 8-6837 (maleate), VUFB-6276 (mesylate)), also known as methiothepin, is a drug described as a "psychotropic agent" of the tricyclic group which was never marketed. It acts as a non-selective antagonist of serotonin, dopamine, and adrenergic receptors and has antipsychotic properties.

Synthesis

The reduction of 2-(4-methylsulfanylphenyl)sulfanylbenzoic acid, CID:2733664 (1) gives [2-(4-methylsulfanylphenyl)sulfanylphenyl]methanol, CID:12853582 (2). Halogenating with thionyl chloride gives 1-(chloromethyl)-2-(4-methylsulfanylphenyl)sulfanylbenzene, CID:12853583 (3). FGI with cyanide gives 2-[2-(4-methylsulfanylphenyl)sulfanylphenyl]acetonitrile, CID:12853584 (4). Alkali hydrolysis of the nitrile to 2-[2-(4-methylsulfanylphenyl)sulfanylphenyl]acetic acid, CID:12383832 (5). PPA cyclization to 3-methylsulfanyl-6H-benzo[b][1]benzothiepin-5-one, CID:827052 (6). The reduction with sodium borohydride gives 3-methylsulfanyl-5,6-dihydrobenzo[b][1]benzothiepin-5-ol, CID:13597048 (7). Halogenating with a second round of thionyl chloride gives 5-chloro-3-methylsulfanyl-5,6-dihydrobenzo[b][1]benzothiepine, CID:12404411. Alkylation with 1-methylpiperazine [109-01-3] completed the synthesis of Metitepine (9).

See also
 Clorotepine
 Perathiepin

References

External links
 

5-HT1E antagonists
5-HT1F antagonists
Alpha-1 blockers
Antipsychotics
Dibenzothiepines
Dopamine antagonists
Diphenylethylpiperazines
Serotonin receptor antagonists
Thioethers